There are no formal rules in the Netherlands to distinguish cities from other settlements. Smaller settlements are usually called dorp, comparable with villages in English speaking countries. The Dutch word for city is stad (plural: steden). The intermediate category of town does not exist in the Netherlands.

Historically, there existed systems of city rights, granted by the territorial lords, which defined the status of a place: a stad or dorp. Cities were self-governing and had several privileges. In 1851 the granting of city rights and all privileges and special status of cities were abolished. Since then, the only local administrative unit is the municipality. Regardless of this legal change, many people still use the old city rights as a criterion: certain small settlements proudly call themselves a stad because they historically had city rights, while other, newer towns may not get this recognition. Yet the old and third largest urban center of The Hague, has, together with Amsterdam' the status of the seat of the national government, but never received city rights for deliberate historical reasons. It can therefore be considered a 'plaats' or a 'village', but, arguably, not a 'stad', which translates to town or city, as it was never granted the right to carry that status.    

Geographers and policy makers can distinguish between places with respect to the number of inhabitants or the economic and planological functions within a larger area. Hence, settlements can be considered a city if they function as an urban centre in a rural area; while larger population centres in densely populated areas are often neither considered a village nor a city and are usually referred to with the generic word plaats (place). Inhabitants may also base their choice of words just on the subjective way they experience life at a certain place.

When discussing cities, the distinction is sometimes made between the cities in two urban network.
The largest urban network is known as Randstad, including the largest four cities (3 with, and 1 without historical city 'rights') in the Netherlands (Amsterdam, Rotterdam, The Hague and Utrecht). The second urban network in the Netherlands is known as Brabantstad, a partnership of the Brabant "Big 5": Eindhoven, Tilburg, Breda, 's-Hertogenbosch and Helmond. In addition, there are several medium-sized cities in the Netherlands without an urban network. Groningen, notably, is a medium-sized city (sixth-largest city in the Netherlands), without an urban network.

See also
City rights in the Low Countries
List of cities, towns and villages in the Netherlands by province
List of populated places in the Netherlands
Municipalities of the Netherlands
Provinces of the Netherlands

External links

 List of cities in the Netherlands at Holland.com (archived 16 March 2018)
 List of cities and towns in the Netherlands at Britannica.com (archived 16 March 2018)

Netherlands
 
 2
Netherlands
Populated places in the Netherlands by province